Colbert Marlot (born 4 March 1963 in Liévin, France) is a former professional footballer who played as a defensive midfielder and is currently head coach at Championnat National 2 team Béziers.

External links
Colbert Marlot profile at chamoisfc79.fr

1963 births
Living people
French footballers
French football managers
Association football midfielders
RC Lens players
OGC Nice players
Chamois Niortais F.C. players
Ligue 2 players
Limoges FC players
SC Abbeville players
Wasquehal Football managers